Dener Gonçalves Pinheiro (born 12 April 1995), simply known as Dener, is a Brazilian footballer who plays for as a midfielder for Marcílio Dias.

Club career
Born in Carapicuíba, São Paulo, Dener graduated with Figueirense's youth setup. On 12 July 2013 he made his first team debut, starting and being booked in a 3–2 away win against Atlético Goianiense for the Série B championship. He finished the campaign with eight appearances, as his side was promoted to Série A.

On 16 July 2014 Dener made his top level debut, starting in a 2–0 win at Coritiba.

Dener arrived at Fagiano Okayama for the 2019 season. But already on 3 March 2019 the club announced, that they had terminated the players contract by mutual consent, and the player would return to Brazil to treat his injury.

Honours
Campeonato Catarinense: 2014

References

External links

Dener at playmakerstats.com (English version of ogol.com.br)

1995 births
Living people
Footballers from São Paulo (state)
Brazilian footballers
Brazilian expatriate footballers
Association football midfielders
Campeonato Brasileiro Série A players
Campeonato Brasileiro Série B players
J2 League players
Figueirense FC players
Vila Nova Futebol Clube players
Fagiano Okayama players
Sertãozinho Futebol Clube players
Associação Ferroviária de Esportes players
Hercílio Luz Futebol Clube players
Clube Náutico Marcílio Dias players
Brazilian expatriate sportspeople in Japan
Expatriate footballers in Japan